Ray Kelly is an Irish referee who officiated several All-Ireland Senior Camogie Championship finals.

He received praise for his refereeing in the 2019 All-Ireland camogie final.

He is from the St Kevin's GAA club in County Kildare.

References

Year of birth missing (living people)
Living people
Camogie referees